Propyl benzoate is an organic chemical compound used as a food additive. It is an ester.

Uses
Propyl benzoate has a nutty odor and sweet fruity or nut-like taste, and as such, it is used as a synthetic flavoring agent in foods. It also has antimicrobial properties and is used as a preservative in cosmetics. It occurs naturally in the sweet cherry and in clove stems, as well as in butter.

Reactions
Propyl benzoate can be synthesized by the transesterification of methyl benzoate with propanol.
Propyl benzoate can also be synthesized by means of Fischer esterification of benzoic acid with propanol.

References

Food additives
Preservatives
Benzoate esters